Amalte (Dargwa: ГӀямалтимахьи) is a rural locality (a selo) in Kuppinsky Selsoviet, Levashinsky District, Republic of Dagestan, Russia. The population was 267 as of 2010.

Geography 
Amalte is located 22 km west of Levashi (the district's administrative centre) by road. Telagu and Kuppa are the nearest rural localities.

Nationalities 
Dargins live there.

References 

Rural localities in Levashinsky District